MOD and TOD are recording formats for use in digital tapeless camcorders. The formats are comparable to XDCAM EX, HDV and AVCHD.

Overview
 
MOD and TOD are informal names of tapeless video formats used by JVC (MOD and TOD), Panasonic (MOD only) and Canon (MOD only) in some models of digital camcorders. Format names correspond to extensions of video files. Neither JVC nor Panasonic, who pioneered the format, explained the meaning of the file extensions, and the formats were never given an official name.  Some think that TOD stands for "Transport stream on disk". MOD is used exclusively for standard definition video files, while TOD is used for high definition files.

The first camcorders that used MOD format appeared in 2003. JVC introduced the Everio GZ-MG30, which recorded directly to an internal hard disk drive. Panasonic unveiled the SDR-S100, which recorded to SD cards. The encoding scheme, data rate, frame rate and frame size closely matched parameters of DVD-video.

In January 2007 JVC announced its first high definition tapeless consumer camcorder, the Everio GZ-HD7, which recorded 1080i MPEG-2 video to either a built-in hard disk drive or an SD memory card. Data rates, frame sizes and frame rate were comparable to 1080-line XDCAM and HDV video. Panasonic has never released a consumer high definition camcorder that used TOD recording format. Instead, Panasonic joined Sony to develop AVCHD.

In January 2008 Canon unveiled a family of tapeless standard definition consumer camcorders: the FS100, FS10 and FS11. All these camcorders record in MOD format.

Both MOD and TOD are file-based formats that are stored on a random-access media. Directory structure and naming convention are identical except for extensions of media files. Each file has a sequential name with last three characters comprising a hexadecimal number, which allows for 4096 unique file names.

Standard definition video is stored in MPEG program stream container files with MOD extension; in most other systems these files have extension MPG or MPEG. High definition video is stored in MPEG transport stream container files with TOD extension; in most other systems these files have M2T extension.

Despite the file structure being unique to this video recording format, the location for still images follows the standard agreed upon by many still camera manufacturers.

Standard definition video can be recorded in 4:3 and 16:9 formats. Some video decoders do not interpret the aspect ratio information in the media file header correctly, so 16:9 video may appear squeezed horizontally when viewed. Software that is shipped with camcorders is capable of processing the aspect ratio information correctly, aided perhaps by the metadata stored in MOI files. There are also third-party tools for modifying the wide-screen aspect ratio information in the media file header so that it satisfies decoders which would otherwise fail to interpret this information correctly in an unmodified MOD file. Some tools such as MediaInfo can correctly report the aspect ratio of widescreen MOD files, but media players may or may not display them correctly depending on the capabilities of the video decoder that they are utilizing at the time.

Conversion to widely accepted formats
MOD video can be viewed on a computer with a player that is capable of reproducing MPEG-2 video. This video can be easily authored for watching on a DVD player without recompression, because it is fully compliant with DVD-video standard.

TOD format is comparable with AVCHD, but cannot be directly played on consumer video equipment. Media files must be packaged into distribution formats like HD DVD or Blu-ray Disc, using authoring software. One of TOD recording modes, "1440CBR", has the same frame size, aspect ratio and frame rate as 1080i HDV, and can be loosely called "HDV on disk".

While many camcorders that produce the MOD and TOD formats also include Windows and/or Mac conversion software to run on your computer, there are other tools available for free to do the same work. Transport stream files can be converted into program stream files without recompressing the video itself. For example, FFmpeg, a free program, performs the conversion on Windows, Mac and Linux systems with the following command
 $ ffmpeg -i myClip.TOD -vcodec copy -acodec copy myClip.mpg
A similar command is used for MOD files:
 $ ffmpeg -f mpeg -i myClip.MOD -vcodec copy -acodec mp2 -ab 192k myClip.mpg

This is no longer necessary if the free and open source VLC media player is used, and, at least on Linux, the process is usually automated, such that connecting the camera to the PC via USB invokes the file manager and then the intuitive action of selecting a TOD file invokes VLC to play the file, or allows a simple copy and paste to transfer the file to the PC. VLC is also available for Windows.

Future of MOD and TOD formats

JVC was the only supporter of TOD format. In 2008 JVC released several hybrid TOD/AVCHD consumer models, and some AVCHD only models. Consumer high definition camcorders offered by JVC from 2009 onwards record only in AVCHD format. Professional JVC tapeless camcorders introduced in 2009 use XDCAM EX format, licensed from Sony. Like TOD, XDCAM EX employs MPEG-2 HD video encoding scheme. Unlike TOD, XDCAM EX uses MP4 container.

As of 2011, MOD format is still being used in standard definition camcorders manufactured by JVC, Panasonic and Canon. Sony employs MPEG-2 video encoding and Program Stream container in its standard definition camcorders too, but the directory structure is different from MOD, and the media files have conventional MPG extension.

MOD and TOD formats do not allow recording progressive-scan video, neither at "film" rates (24, 25, 30 frames/s) nor at "reality" rates (50, 60 frames/s). This limitation makes MOD and TOD formats suboptimal for online video viewing, because most video hosting websites stream progressive-scan video. On another hand, AVCHD allows recording progressive-scan high-definition video at both "film" and "reality" rates.

Products

JVC MOD camcorders 

 2004: GZ-MC100 (SD),  GZ-MC200 (SD)
 2005: GZ-MG30 (HDD),  GZ-MG70 (HDD)
 2006: GZ-MG37 (HDD),  GZ-MG77 (HDD), GZ-MG505 (HDD, SD/SDHC card)
 2007: GZ-MG130 (HDD), GZ-MG135AA (HDD, SD card), GZ-MG155 (HDD), GZ-MG175 (HDD, SD/SDHC card), GZ-MG255 (HDD), GZ-MG555 (HDD, SD/SDHC card)
 2008: GZ-MS100U (SD/SDHC card), GZ-MG465 (60 GB HDD, MicroSD)
 2008: GZ-MG7230 (30 GB HDD, MicroSD)
 2009: GZ-MG630 (60 GB HDD, MicroSD), GZ-MG670 (80 GB HDD, MicroSD), GZ-MG680 (120 GB HDD, MicroSD)

JVC TOD camcorders 
 2007: GZ-HD7 (HDD, SD/SDHC), GZ-HD3 (HDD, SD/SDHC)
 March 2008: GZ-HD5 (HDD, MicroSD), GZ-HD6 (HDD, MicroSD)
 June 2008: GZ-HD30, GZ-HD40 (HDD, MicroSD, capable of both TOD and AVCHD recording)

Panasonic MOD camcorders 
 2003: SV-AV100 (SD card)
 2005: SDR-S100 (SD card)
 2006: SDR-S150 (SD/SDHC card)
 2007: SDR-S10 (SD/SDHC card), SDR-H18 (HDD, SD card), SDR-H200 (HDD, SD/SDHC card)
 2008: SDR-H20 (HDD, SD/SDHC card), SDR-H60 (HDD, SD/SDHC card)
 2008: SDR-S7 (SD/SDHC card)
 2008: SDR-SW20 (SD/SDHC card)
 2009: SDR-SW21 (SD/SDHC card)
 2009: SDR-S26 (SD/SDHC card)
 2010: SDR-S50 (SD/SDHC/SDXC card), SDR-T50P, SDR-T55P (SD/SDHC/SDXC card, internal flash), SDR-H85P (SD/SDHC/SDXC card, hard drive)
 2010: SDR-H85 (HDD, SD/SDHC card)
 2011: SDR-H100 (SD/SDHC/SDXC card, hard drive)
 SDR-H280 (HDD, SD Card)
 SDR-H288GK (HDD, SD Card)

Canon MOD Camcorders
 2008: FS100 (SDHC), FS10 (SDHC), FS11 (SDHC)
 2009: FS200 (SDHC), FS21 (SDHC), FS22 (SDHC)

Specifications

See also
 H.262/MPEG-2 Part 2: digital video compression scheme
 HDV: tape-based high definition format that uses MPEG-2 Part 2 video compression
 XDCAM: a family of tapeless high definition formats that use MPEG-2 Part 2 video compression

References

External links

High-definition television
Video storage
Filename extensions